Acharya Vamana (latter half of the 8th century - early 9th century) was an Indian Rhetorician.

Vamana's investigation into the nature of a Kāvya is known as theory of Riti.

Vamana's Kavyalankara Sutra is considered as the first attempt at evolving a philosophy of literary aesthetics. He regarded that riti is the soul of Kavya. He presented his formulations in the form of Sutras.

References

8th-century Indian philosophers
Indian male writers
Philosophers of art
Indian rhetoricians